Harry A. Binzer (December 26, 1897 – June 17, 1959) was a member of the Washington State Senate.

Career
Binzer was a member of the Senate in 1947. He was a Republican.

References

1897 births
1959 deaths
Republican Party Washington (state) state senators
20th-century American politicians